The 2015 American Athletic Conference men's soccer tournament was the 3rd edition of the American Athletic Conference Men's Soccer Tournament. The tournament decided the American Athletic Conference champion and guaranteed representative into the 2015 NCAA Division I Men's Soccer Championship.  First round matchups were held at campus sites on Saturday, November 7, while the semifinals were played at Corbett Soccer Stadium on the campus of South Florida in Tampa, FL.

Seeding and format
The teams are seeded based on their performance in the conference's round-robin regular season.  All eight teams qualify for the event.  Connecticut claimed the third seed over Tulsa based on its win over second seeded South Florida.  UConn and Tulsa tied in the regular season, and both lost to top seeded SMU.  Memphis took the seventh seed based on its head to head win over Cincinnati.

Bracket

All-Tournament team
Kwame Awuah, Connecticut
Abdou Mbacke Thiam, Connecticut
Tyler Leeman, Connecticut
Scott Levene, Connecticut
John Lujano, SMU
Nazeem Bartman, South Florida
Bradley Bourgeois, Tulsa (most outstanding defensive player)
Geoffrey Dee, Tulsa
Jake McGuire, Tulsa
Lesley Nchanji, Tulsa (most outstanding offensive player)
Miguel Velazquez, Tulsa

References

 
American Athletic Conference Men's Soccer Tournament
American soccer tournament